Polypodium scouleri is a species of fern known by the common names leathery polypody, Scouler's polypody, coast polypody and leather-leaf fern. It is native to coastal western North America from British Columbia to Guadalupe Island off Baja California. It is a plant of the coastline, growing in cracks on coastal bluffs, in oceanside forests, beach dunes, and similar habitat. It is often affected by heavy fogs and sea spray. This polypody anchors with a waxy, scaly rhizome. It produces triangular or oblong leaves up to 85 centimeters in maximum length and 8 cm width. Each leaf is made up of many round-tipped linear or oblong segments which are usually stiff and leathery in texture and edged with shallow, rounded teeth. The underside of each leaf segment is crowded with rounded sori each up to half a centimeter wide. The sori contain the spores.

References
 Jepson
 C.Michael Hogan, ed. 2010.  ‘’Polypodium scouleri’’ . Encyclopedia of Life.

External links
Jepson Manual Treatment — Polypodium scouleri
Washington Burke Museum
Polypodium scouleri - Photo gallery

scouleri
Ferns of the United States
Ferns of California
Flora of the West Coast of the United States
Flora of Baja California
Flora of Mexican Pacific Islands
Natural history of the California chaparral and woodlands
Natural history of the California Coast Ranges
Natural history of the San Francisco Bay Area
Ferns of the Americas